The Conseil supérieur de la langue française is an advisory council in Quebec, Canada, whose mission is "to advise the minister responsible for the application of the Charter of the French language on any question relative to the French language in Quebec". It works in close collaboration with equivalent bodies in France, Belgium and Switzerland.

Section 185 of the Quebec Charter of the French Language establishes a Council under the name of Conseil supérieur de la langue française. It was initially created in 1977 with the adoption of the Charter.

Mandate 
The mandate of the Quebec Council is to "advise the minister responsible for the application of the Charter of the French language on any question relative to the French language in Quebec."

Specifically, the Council may:
 give its opinion to the minister on any question that he or she submits;
 inform the minister on any question which the Council believes requires the attention of the government.

Powers 
In order to carry out its mission, the Council may:
 receive and hear observations by individuals or groups; 
 carry out or have someone carry out the studies and research it finds necessary.

In addition, it may inform the public on any question relative to the French language in Quebec.

Council members 
The Council is made up of eight members appointed by the government:

Studies and Research 
The council has conducted many studies since 1978, most of which are available online for consultation. The studies touch various subjects from linguistic human rights, language shifts and assimilation, language planning, quality of written and spoken language, terminology, language demographics, challenges to linguistic and cultural diversity in the era of globalization etc.

Award 
The Council awards various prizes:
 Medal of the Ordre des francophones d'Amérique (Order of the francophones of America) — awarded since 1978
 Prix du 3 juillet 1608 (3 July 1608 Prize) — awarded since 1978
 Prix Jules-Fournier (Jules Fournier Prize) — awarded since 1981
 Prix Raymond-Charette (Raymond Charette Prize) — since 2000
 Prix Émile-Ollivier (Émile Ollivier Prize) — since 2005

See also 
 Académie française
 American French (disambiguation)

References

External links 
 Conseil supérieur de la langue française (Quebec)

Francophonie
French language in Quebec
Organizations based in Quebec City
Quebec language policy